Litoceras is a trocholitid (Tarphycerida) genus that has been found in the Lower and Middle Ordovician of Newfoundland. Whorls in Litoceras have a broadly rounded cross section with its width greater than its height.  Litoceras somewhat resembles the tarphyceratid Pionoceras from the same time, except for the siphuncle being dorsal and in the center.

Species
Species within the genera Litoceras include:

 Litoceras calciferum (Billings, 1865)
 Litoceras versutum (Billings, 1865)
 Litoceras whiteavsi Hyatt, 1894

References

Furnish, W.M and Glenister, Brian F (1964); Nautiloidea -Tarphycerida in the Treatise on Invertebrate Paleontology, Part L, Nautiloidea, Geological Society of America and Univ of Kansas press.

Prehistoric nautiloid genera
Early Ordovician first appearances
Middle Ordovician extinctions
Paleozoic life of Newfoundland and Labrador
Tarphycerida